Ogo Oluwa is a Local Government Area in Oyo State, Nigeria. Its headquarters are in the town of Ajaawa.

It has an area of 369 km and a population of 65,184 at the 2006 census.

The postal code of the area is 210.

References

External links
 Ogo Oluwa Local Government

Local Government Areas in Oyo State